James McBain may refer to:

 James McBain (naturalist) (1807–1879), Royal Navy surgeon and naturalist
 James McBain (snooker player) (born 1978), British snooker player
 James Alexander McBain (1910–1988), Canadian member of Parliament
 James William McBain (1882–1953), Canadian chemist
 James McBain, musician known for the metal music project Hellripper